Oscar De Los Santos is an American politician. He is a Democratic member of the Arizona House of Representatives elected to represent District 11 in 2022.

Life 
De Los Santos was born in Los Angeles to Gregorio and María Dolores. They were immigrants from Tenamaxtlán. In 2012, he was the youngest Florida field organizer for the Obama campaign. In 2015, he completed a bachelor's degree in political science from the University of Southern California where he graduated magna cum laude and was inducted into Phi Beta Kappa. He was a Truman scholar. From 2015 to 2016, he taught English and social studies to sixth graders at Champion South Mountain School in Phoenix, Arizona. He interned for the National Economic Council and the U.S. House Of Representatives. De Los Santos was a lobbyist and head of public policy for the Association of Arizona Food Banks.

As a Rhodes Scholar, he completed a master's in public policy from the University of Oxford in 2018. He earned a master's degree in Christian social ethics from the Union Theological Seminary in 2020. He is a J.D. student at Yale Law School and received a The Paul & Daisy Soros Fellowship for New Americans in 2022. 

During the 2022 Arizona House of Representatives election, De Los Santos was elected to represent District 11. He is the first out LGBT person to represent District 11.

References

External links 

 
 Biography at Ballotpedia

Democratic Party members of the Arizona House of Representatives
Living people
Year of birth missing (living people)
Hispanic and Latino American state legislators in Arizona
21st-century American politicians
21st-century LGBT people
LGBT state legislators in Arizona
American politicians of Mexican descent
University of Southern California alumni
Union Theological Seminary (New York City) alumni
Alumni of the University of Oxford
LGBT Hispanic and Latino American people